Elias Sunny (born 2 August 1986) is a Bangladeshi international cricketer. Sunny made his Test cricket debut in 2011 and has subsequently played both Test and limited overs cricket played for the Bangladesh national team.

Career
Sunny made his first-class cricket debut for Dhaka Division in the 2003/04 season and has since played for Chittagong Division. He had played for Bangladesh under-17s in 2002/03.

Sunny made his international debut in the first Test against the West Indies at Chittagong on 21 October 2011. In the first innings he bowled 23 over and took six wickets for 94 run, finishing with match figures of 7/128.

He made his Twenty20 International debut at Belfast in Northern Ireland in July 2012 against Ireland. He took 5/13 from his four overs, including a maiden to restrict the hosts to 119 runs. He became the first bowler to take five wickets on T20I debut and won the Man of the Match award. As of April 2018 he has the best bowling figures on T20I debut He is also the only bowler to take five wicket hauls on both Test and T20I debut.

Family
Relationship Status- Married,
Wife- Nowrin Anjum Barsha,
Children's-03

See also
 List of Bangladesh cricketers who have taken five-wicket hauls on Test debut

References

External links

Bangladeshi cricketers
Bangladesh Test cricketers
Bangladesh One Day International cricketers
Bangladesh Twenty20 International cricketers
Dhaka Division cricketers
Chittagong Division cricketers
Fortune Barishal cricketers
Dhaka Dominators cricketers
Cricketers who have taken five wickets on Test debut
Living people
1986 births
Cricketers from Dhaka
Abahani Limited cricketers
Sheikh Jamal Dhanmondi Club cricketers
Prime Doleshwar Sporting Club cricketers
Gazi Group cricketers
Bangladesh Central Zone cricketers
Chattogram Challengers cricketers
Khulna Division cricketers
Rangpur Riders cricketers